D-9 or Digital-S as it was originally known, is a professional digital video videocassette format created by JVC in 1995.

It is a direct competitor to Sony's Digital Betacam. Its name was changed to D-9 in 1999 by the SMPTE. It was used to a small extent in Europe and Asia and saw some use in the US, notably by the Fox News Channel, but was a commercial failure compared with Digital Betacam.  It was superseded by high definition tapeless formats.

Technical details
D-9 uses a tape shell of the VHS form factor—though physically incompatible—but the tape itself uses a much higher quality metal particle formulation. The recording system is digital and for video uses DV compression at a 50 Mbit/s bitrate. Video is recorded in 4:2:2 component format at a variety of standard-definition resolutions, in either 4:3 or 16:9 aspect ratios. Audio is recorded as 16-bit/48 kHz PCM with up to four separate channels. Video quality is generally very high; at standard definition, D-9's quality is comparable with Digital Betacam.  The BR-D51U model is additionally capable of analogue S-VHS playback.

HD recording
For high definition video recording, JVC developed an extension to D-9 called D-9 HD, using twice the number of recording heads to record a 100 Mbit/s video bitstream at resolutions of 720p60, 1080i60 and 1080p24. This variant can also record 8 channels of PCM audio at 16 bits and 48 kHz. The higher data rate and increased tape speed mean that the recording time of any given cassette would be halved. D-9 HD, based on specifications, would have been higher quality than Sony HDCAM but lower than Sony HDCAM SR; no objective tests were made comparing these formats. It is not clear whether this proposed format was ever manufactured or sold.

Additional information
Although D-9 uses the same video codec (DV) as MiniDV, the video bitrate of D-9 is significantly higher than that of the "prosumer" format. DVCPRO achieves bitrate parity with D-9 and D-9 HD, but has a slower tape speed, making it less reliable. Some of the D-9 television studio gear is capable of recording with Sel-Sync or pre-read and is provided with four-channel audio like Digital Betacam. Serial digital interfaces (SDI) are also provided. A dockable recorder, the JVC BR-D40, attached to a variety of cameras, and there was a one-piece camcorder, the JVC DY-70U.

References

External links
JVC's Japanese D-9 product page

See also

Betacam
Digital Betacam
HDCAM
D-VHS

Video storage
Audiovisual introductions in 1995